Dipterocarpus caudatus is a species of plant in the evergreen or semi-evergreen family Dipterocarpaceae. The species name is derived from Latin ( = tailed) and refers to the narrow acumen of the leaf apex. It is an emergent tree, up to 50 m tall, in mixed dipterocarp forest on dry ridges. It is found within Sumatra, coastal Peninsular Malaysia, Singapore and Borneo. It is a medium hardwood sold under the trade names of Keruing. It was formerly most abundant along the coastal hills on sandy soils, but is endangered due to land conversion. D. caudatus is found in at least one protected area (Sepilok Forest Reserve).

References

caudatus
Trees of Sumatra
Trees of Malaya
Trees of Borneo
Endangered flora of Asia